Goebelsmuhle is a village in the commune of Bourscheid, in north-eastern Luxembourg.  , the village had a population of 17, which subsequently increased to 34 by 2019.  Nearby is the confluence of the Sauer and the Wiltz.

It is served by Goebelsmuhle railway station, which lies on Chemins de Fer Luxembourgeois' Line 10.

References

Bourscheid, Luxembourg
Villages in Luxembourg